Xingtai Dalian Airport  is an airport serving the city of Xingtai in Hebei Province, China. It is mainly a military airport, but the airport also served commercial flights between 1993 and 2001. In 2011, the Civil Aviation Administration of China approved the 300 million yuan expansion plan for the airport, and it is expected to resume commercial service within five years. At the present time, the city was served by nearby Jinan Yaoqiang International Airport and Shijiazhuang Zhengding International Airport.

See also
List of airports in China
List of the busiest airports in China

References

Airports in Hebei
Proposed airports in China
Chinese Air Force bases